Puebla, Mexico, may refer to:

Puebla, one of the 32 component federal entities of the United Mexican States
Puebla, Puebla, capital city of that state (also known, inter alia, as "Puebla de los Ángeles", "Heróica Puebla de Zaragoza", etc.)